Twi is a dialect of the Akan language spoken in southern and central Ghana by several million people, mainly of the Akan people, the largest of the seventeen major ethnic groups in Ghana. Twi has about 17–18 million speakers in total, including second-language speakers; about 80% of the Ghanaian population speaks Twi as a first or second language. Like other West African languages, Twi is a tonal language.

Twi is a common name for mutually intelligible former literary dialects of the Akan language, Bono, Asante, and Akuapem. Akuapem, as the first Akan dialect to be used for Bible translation, has become the prestige dialect as a result. It is also spoken by the people of southeastern Côte d'Ivoire.

Etymology 
The name "Twi" is derived from the name of a Bono king, Nana Baffuor Twi.

Phonology

Consonants

Vowels

Tone 
Twi has at least 5 tones: high, mid, low, rising, falling.

Diphthongs 
Twi contains the diphthongs /ao/, /eɛ/, /ei/, /ia/, /ie/, /oɔ/, /ue/, and /uo/.

Orthography

The letters C, J, Q, V, X and Z are also used, but only in loanwords.

Naming system 
The Akan peoples use a common Akan (Ghana) naming system of giving the first name to a child, based on the day of the week that the child was born. Almost all the tribes and clans in Ghana have a similar custom.

References

External links 

 
 Language resources at LangMedia (Five College Center for World Languages)
 Akan basic course
 Bibliography of structural properties of the Twi language at WALS Online (The World Atlas of Language Structures)
 Akuapem Twi to English Parallel Text Dataset

Ashanti people
Akan
Akan language